Sir Robert Robinson  (13 September 1886 – 8 February 1975) was a British organic chemist and Nobel laureate recognised in 1947 for his research on plant dyestuffs (anthocyanins) and alkaloids. In 1947, he also received the Medal of Freedom with Silver Palm.

Biography

Early life
He was born at Rufford House Farm, near Chesterfield, Derbyshire the son of James Bradbury Robinson, a maker of surgical dressings, and his wife, Jane Davenport.

Robinson went to school at the Chesterfield Grammar School and the private Fulneck School. He then studied chemistry at the University of Manchester, graduating BSc in 1905. In 1907 he was awarded an 1851 Research Fellowship from the Royal Commission for the Exhibition of 1851 to continue his research at the University of Manchester.

He was appointed as the first Professor of Pure and Applied Organic Chemistry in the School of Chemistry at the University of Sydney in 1912. He was briefly at St Andrews University (1920–22) and then was offered the Chair of Organic Chemistry at Manchester University. In 1928 he moved from there to be a professor at University College London where he stayed only two years. He was the Waynflete Professor of Chemistry at Oxford University from 1930 and a Fellow of Magdalen College, Oxford.

Robinson Close, in the Science Area at Oxford, is named after him, as is the Robert Robinson Laboratory at the University of Liverpool, the Sir Robert Robinson Laboratory of Organic Chemistry at the University of Manchester and the Robinson and Cornforth Laboratories at the University of Sydney.

Robinson was a strong amateur chess player. He represented Oxford University in a friendly match with a team from Bletchley Park in December 1944; in which he lost his game to pioneering computer scientist I. J. Good. He was president of the British Chess Federation from 1950 to 1953, and with Raymond Edwards he co-authored the book The Art and Science of Chess (Batsford, 1972).

Research
His synthesis of tropinone (a precursor for atropine & benztropine) in 1917 was not only a big step in alkaloid chemistry but also showed that tandem reactions in a one-pot synthesis are capable of forming bicyclic molecules.

He invented the symbol for benzene having a circle in the middle whilst working at St Andrews University in 1923. He is known for inventing the use of the curly arrow to represent electron movement, and he is also known for discovering the molecular structures of morphine and penicillin.
Robinson annulation has had application in the total synthesis of steroids.

Alongside Edward Charles Dodds, Robinson had also been involved in the orig synthesis of diethylstilboestrol.

In 1957 Robinson founded the journal Tetrahedron with fifty other editors for Pergamon Press.

Publications

The Structural Relationship of Natural Products (1955)

Family

He married twice. In 1912 he married Gertrude Maud Walsh. Following her death in 1954, in 1957 he married a widow, Mrs Stern Sylvia Hillstrom (née Hershey).

See also
 List of presidents of the Royal Society

References

External links
  including the Nobel Lecture on December 12, 1947 Some Polycyclic Natural Products
ABC Online Forum

1886 births
1975 deaths
Alumni of the University of Manchester
English chemists
Burials at Kensal Green Cemetery
Fellows of Magdalen College, Oxford
Fellows of the Royal Society
Presidents of the Royal Society
Members of the Order of Merit
Nobel laureates in Chemistry
British Nobel laureates
Organic chemists
People from Chesterfield, Derbyshire
Recipients of the Copley Medal
Royal Medal winners
Knights Bachelor
Recipients of the Medal of Freedom
People educated at Chesterfield Grammar School
Faraday Lecturers
Fellows of the American Academy of Arts and Sciences
Foreign associates of the National Academy of Sciences
Members of the Bavarian Academy of Sciences
Members of the French Academy of Sciences
Waynflete Professors of Chemistry
Place of birth missing
People educated at Fulneck School
English Nobel laureates
Fellows of the Royal Society of Edinburgh
Manchester Literary and Philosophical Society